Pandanus clandestinus is a species of plant in the family Pandanaceae. It is endemic to New Caledonia.

References

Endemic flora of New Caledonia
clandestinus
Conservation dependent plants
Taxonomy articles created by Polbot